This is a select list of players from the Kansas City Chiefs football team from the National Football League.

For more information, see Kansas City Chiefs.

Current roster

Chiefs quarterbacks

Throughout the Chiefs' near five-decade existence, there have been twelve starting quarterbacks to lead the team.  Among the most prolific include Hall of Famers Len Dawson and Joe Montana, as well as superb quarterbacks of their era like Trent Green.

In the past few decades, the Chiefs have relied on veteran quarterbacks to lead their team. The last quarterback to be drafted by Kansas City that later went on to claim the starting position was Bill Kenney in 1980.  Since Kenney's retirement in 1988. the Chiefs never drafted their own quarterback to develop until Brodie Croyle was drafted in 2006.  When head coach Herman Edwards arrived in 2006, he stated that he was looking towards implementing younger players into his gameplan, and he was arguably looking to start at the quarterback position.

The Chiefs have also had a repeated history of backup quarterbacks that steal the spotlight. Mike Livingston led the Chiefs to the playoffs in their 1969 season after starting quarterback Len Dawson was injured for the majority of the year.  Most recently, Rich Gannon took over for the injured Elvis Grbac in the 1997 season, but was revoked of the job in favor of Grbac's return for the playoffs.  The Chiefs lost in the playoffs to the eventual Super Bowl champion Denver Broncos.  A similar incident occurred in the 2006 season and playoffs when Trent Green and the Chiefs' offense failed to get a first down in the first forty-two minutes of the game. Backup quarterback Damon Huard, whom led the Chiefs on a 5-2 record in Green's absence, never played a down in the playoff loss to—coincidentally—the eventual Super Bowl champion Indianapolis Colts.

Super Bowl IV (1969) champions

Honored players

Pro Football Hall of Famers

Chiefs Hall of Fame

The Kansas City Chiefs feature forty-four former players and franchise contributors in their team hall of fame. Several of the team's names are featured at Arrowhead Stadium in a "ring of honor." A new member has been inducted in an annual ceremony, with the exception of the 1983 season.

1970s
1970 Lamar Hunt, team founder and owner
1971 #36 Mack Lee Hill, Running back
1972 #75 Jerry Mays, Defensive tackle
1973 #84 Fred Arbanas, Tight end
1974 #42 Johnny Robinson, Safety
1975 #88 Chris Burford, Wide receiver
1976 #55 E. J. Holub, Center/Linebacker
1977 #77 Jim Tyrer, Offensive tackle
1978 #21 Mike Garrett, Running back
1979 #16 Len Dawson, Quarterback

1980s
1980 #78 Bobby Bell, Linebacker
1981 #86 Buck Buchanan, Defensive tackle
1982 #89 Otis Taylor, Wide receiver
1983 No induction
1984 #71 Ed Budde, Guard
1985 #63 Willie Lanier, Linebacker
1986 #18 Emmitt Thomas, Cornerback
1987 Hank Stram, Coach
1988 #44 Jerrel Wilson, Punter
1989 #14 Ed Podolak, Running back
|-

1990s
1990 #51 Jim Lynch, Linebacker
1991 #28 Abner Haynes, Running back
1992 #3 Jan Stenerud, Kicker
1993 #69 Sherrill Headrick, Linebacker
1994 #58 Jack Rudnay, Center
1995 #32 Curtis McClinton, Running back
1996 #20 Deron Cherry, Safety
1997 #73 Dave Hill, Offensive tackle
1998 #67 Art Still, Defensive end
1999 #34 Lloyd Burruss, Safety

2000s
2000 #35 Christian Okoye, Running back
2001 #58 Derrick Thomas, Linebacker
2002 #76 John Alt, Offensive tackle
2003 #59 Gary Spani, Linebacker
2004 #37 Joe Delaney, Running back
2005 Jack Steadman, team vice chairman and general manager
2006 #90 Neil Smith, Defensive end
2007 #29 Albert Lewis, Cornerback
2008 #61 Curley Culp, Defensive tackle
2009 #8 Nick Lowery, Place kicker
|-

2010s
2010 Marty Schottenheimer, Coach
2011 #31 Kevin Ross, Cornerback 
2012 #68 Will Shields, Guard 
2013 #26 Gary Barbaro, Defensive back 
2014 #31 Priest Holmes, Running back
2015 #24 Gary Green, Cornerback 
2016 #49 Tony Richardson, Fullback 
2017 #88 Carlos Carson, Wide Receiver 
2018 #88 Tony Gonzalez, Tight End 
2019 #54 Brian Waters, Guard

Missouri Sports Hall of Fame
 Lamar Hunt, team Founder and Owner
 Marty Schottenheimer, Coach
 Hank Stram, Coach
 Dick Vermeil, Coach
 #32 Marcus Allen, Running Back
 #84 Fred Arbanas, Tight End
 #78 Bobby Bell, Linebacker
 #71 Ed Budde, Guard
 #20 Deron Cherry, Safety
 #16 Len Dawson, Quarterback
 #31 Priest Holmes, Running Back
 #46 Jim Kearney, Safety
 #63 Willie Lanier, Linebacker
 #32 Curtis McClinton, Halfback
 #54 Curt Merz, Guard
 #76 Mo Moorman, Guard
 #35 Christian Okoye, Running Back
 #14 Ed Podolak, Running Back
 #49 Tony Richardson, Fullback
 #42 Johnny Robinson, Safety
 #70 Jerome Sally, Nose Tackle
 #68 Will Shields, Guard
 #90 Neil Smith, Defensive End
 #59 Gary Spani, Linebacker
 #3 Jan Stenerud, Kicker
 #67 Art Still, Defensive End
 #89 Otis Taylor, Wide Receiver
 #18 Emmitt Thomas, Cornerback

Other notable alumni
 #26 Gary Barbaro, DB
 #4 Steve Fuller, QB
 #24 Fred "The Hammer" Williamson, DB
 Bobby Hunt (1962 Dallas Texans - 1967 Kansas City Chiefs; Defensive Back, and a member of the American Football League Hall of Fame.)
 #9 Bill Kenney, QB
 #99 Ernie Ladd (Defensive tackle; 1967-1968. Also played for the San Diego Chargers and the Houston Oilers, and a member of the American Football League Hall of Fame.)
 #61 Curley Culp, DT
 #8 Nick Lowery, K
 #63 Bill Maas, DT
 #32 Curtis McClinton (scored a touchdown in Super Bowl I)
 #32 Tony Reed, RB
 #86 J. T. Smith, WR
 #83 Stephone Paige, WR
 #17 Elmo Wright and the Elmo Wright Touchdown Dance
 #10 Mike Livingston, QB (Led the Chiefs in their championship 1969 season while Len Dawson was injured)
 #31 Kevin Ross, DB
 #61 Tim Grunhard, C
 #38 Kimble Anders, RB
 #17 Steve DeBerg, QB
 #40 James Hasty, CB
 #49 Tony Richardson, FB (1995–2005, a major factor in the Chiefs' offensive success)
 #77 Willie Roaf, T (2002–2005, dubbed the "heart and soul" of Kansas City's offense by fans during the Dick Vermeil era)
 #12 Rich Gannon, QB (1995–1998, backup quarterback under Steve Bono and Elvis Grbac)
 #88 Morris Stroud, TE (1970–1974), second tallest person to ever play in the NFL.
 #68 Will Shields, G (1993–2006), never missed a game in his entire 14-year career all with the Chiefs and a major part of the Chiefs' offensive successes in the 1990s and early 2000s
 #88 Tony Gonzalez, TE, finished his career with the Atlanta Falcons

References

Kansas City Chiefs players
K
players